Dioni José Guerra Ford (born September 27, 1971, in Puerto La Cruz, Venezuela) is a former Venezuelan footballer who played for clubs of Venezuela and in Deportes Concepción in Chile.

Teams
  Deportivo Anzoátegui 1991–1992
  Carabobo 1993–1994
  Minervén 1994–1995
  Deportes Concepción 1996–1997
  Deportivo Chacao 1997–1998
  Deportivo Táchira 1998
  Deportivo Italchacao 1999–2000
  Trujillanos FC 2000–2002
  Caracas FC 2002–2004
  UA Maracaibo 2004–2006
  Aragua 2006
  Deportivo Italia 2007
  PVDSA Gas 2007

References
 Profile at BDFA

External links

1971 births
Living people
Venezuelan footballers
Venezuelan expatriate footballers
Venezuela international footballers
Carabobo F.C. players
Minervén S.C. players
Deportes Concepción (Chile) footballers
Deportivo Italia players
Deportivo Táchira F.C. players
Trujillanos FC players
Caracas FC players
Deportivo Anzoátegui players
UA Maracaibo players
Aragua FC players
Chilean Primera División players
Expatriate footballers in Chile
Association football forwards
Venezuelan expatriate sportspeople in Chile
People from Puerto la Cruz